Sarah Bolger (born 28 February 1991) is an Irish actress. She starred in the films In America (2003), Stormbreaker (2006), The Spiderwick Chronicles (2008), The Moth Diaries (2011), The Lazarus Effect (2015), Emelie (2015), and A Good Woman Is Hard to Find (2019). On television, she portrayed Princess Mary Tudor in The Tudors (2008–2010), for which she won an IFTA award, and Princess Aurora in Once Upon a Time (2012–2015). Bolger also appeared on the series Into the Badlands (2015–2017) and stars on Mayans M.C. (2018–present).

Early life and education
Bolger was born in Dublin to father Derek, a butcher and mother Monica, a housewife and grew up in the Southside suburb of Rathfarnham. Her younger sister, Emma, also acted and has since pursued academia.

Bolger attended Loreto High School Beaufort from 2003 to 2009 and took classes at Ann Kavanagh's Young People's Theatre. She spoke about her Catholicism, inspired by her late grandparents, and role as a communion minister at her local church in a 2011 interview with the Irish Independent.

Career
Bolger starred in In America with her sister, Emma. From 2008 to 2010, she portrayed Princess Mary Tudor in The Tudors. Bolger starred in Stormbreaker alongside Alex Pettyfer. She also starred in the film adaptation of the children's novel The Spiderwick Chronicles. She filmed a pilot called Locke & Key, and will star in the movie Starbright.

Bolger guest starred as Princess Aurora in the second, third, and fourth seasons of the fairy tale drama, Once Upon a Time.

Bolger played the female lead role, Umi, in the English version of the 2011 Studio Ghibli film From Up on Poppy Hill, and starred as Lucy in As Cool as I Am in 2013. In 2014, she made an appearance on TV series, Mixology. Bolger co-starred in David Gelb's thriller film The Lazarus Effect.

In 2015, she starred in the AMC martial arts show Into the Badlands and the Freddie Steinmark biopic My All American.

In 2016, she starred as the title character in the horror film Emelie.

In March 2017, it was reported by Deadline Hollywood that Bolger was to star in the crime-thriller A Good Woman Is Hard to Find directed by Abner Pastoll. Filming completed in December 2017, with the film released in 2019.

Other projects
In January 2011, Bolger was selected to be in photographer Kevin Abosch's project "The Face of Ireland" alongside other Irish celebrities including Sinéad O'Connor, Neil Jordan, and Pierce Brosnan.

Filmography

Film

Television

Video games

Awards and nominations

References

External links

 
 
 
 

Living people
1991 births
Actresses from County Dublin
20th-century Irish actresses
21st-century Irish actresses
Irish child actresses
Irish expatriates in England
Irish expatriates in the United States
Irish film actresses
Irish television actresses
Irish voice actresses
People from Rathfarnham